The Piano Concerto for the Left Hand in D major was composed by Maurice Ravel between 1929 and 1930, concurrently with his Piano Concerto in G major. It was commissioned by the Austrian pianist Paul Wittgenstein, who lost his right arm during World War I. The Concerto had its premiere on 5 January 1932, with Wittgenstein as soloist performing with the Vienna Symphony Orchestra.

Composition and premiere
The piece was commissioned by Paul Wittgenstein, a concert pianist who had lost his right arm in the First World War.

In preparing for composition, Ravel studied several pieces written for one-handed piano, including Camille Saint-Saëns's Six Études pour la main gauche (Six Études for the Left Hand) (Op. 135), Leopold Godowsky's transcription for the left hand of Frédéric Chopin's Etudes (Opp. 10 and 25), Carl Czerny's Ecole de la main gauche (School of the Left Hand) (Op. 399), 24 études pour la main gauche (Op. 718), Charles-Valentin Alkan's Fantaisie in A major (Op. 76 No. 1), and Alexander Scriabin's Prelude and Nocturne for the Left Hand (Op. 9).

Wittgenstein gave the premiere with Robert Heger and the Vienna Symphony Orchestra on 5 January 1932; Ravel had first offered the premiere to Arturo Toscanini, who declined.

The first French pianist to perform the work was Jacques Février, chosen by Ravel.

Structure

Ravel is quoted in one source as saying that the piece is in only one movement and in another as saying the piece is divided into two movements linked together. According to Marie-Noëlle Masson, the piece has a tripartite structure: slow–fast–slow, instead of the usual fast–slow–fast. Whatever the internal structure may be, the 18–19 minute piece negotiates several sections in various tempi and keys without pause. Towards the end of the piece, some of the music of the early slow sections is overlaid with the faster music, so that two tempi occur simultaneously.

The concerto begins with the double basses softly arpeggiating an ambiguous harmony (E-A-D-G) being the background to an unusual solo of the contrabassoon. Although these notes are later given great structural weight, they are also the four open strings on the double bass, creating the illusion at the start that the orchestra is still tuning up. As is traditional in a concerto, the thematic material is presented first in the orchestra and then echoed by the piano. Not so traditional is the dramatic piano cadenza which first introduces the soloist and prefigures the piano's statement of the opening material. This material includes both an A and a B theme, though the B theme receives little exposure. An additional theme introduced at the beginning exhibits several similarities to the Dies irae chant.

An excerpt from the faster section, sometimes referenced as the scherzo, is shown in the following example.

Throughout the piece, Ravel creates ambiguity between triple and duple rhythms. This example highlights one of the more notable instances of this.

The concerto is scored for a large orchestra consisting of piccolo, 2 flutes, 2 oboes, English horn, piccolo clarinet (in E), 2 clarinets (in A), bass clarinet (in A), 2 bassoons, contrabassoon, 4 horns, 3 trumpets, 3 trombones, tuba, timpani, triangle, snare drum, cymbals, bass drum, wood block, tam-tam, harp, strings, and the solo piano.

Reception and legacy
Although at first Wittgenstein did not take to its jazz-influenced rhythms and harmonies, he grew to like the piece. When Ravel first heard him play the concerto at a private concert in the French embassy in Vienna, he was furious. 'He heard lines taken from the orchestral part and added to the solo, harmonies changed, parts added, bars cut and at the end a newly created series of great swirling arpeggios in the final cadenza. The composer was beside himself with indignation and disbelief.' Later Wittgenstein agreed to perform the concerto as written, and the two men patched up their differences, 'but the whole episode left a bitter taste in both their mouths'.

In May 1930 Ravel had had a major disagreement with Arturo Toscanini over the correct tempo for Boléro (he conducted it too fast for Ravel's liking, who said he should play it at the slower speed he had in mind, or not at all). In September, Ravel patched up the relationship and invited Toscanini to conduct the world premiere of the Piano Concerto for the Left Hand, but the conductor declined.

Even before the premiere, in 1931 Alfred Cortot made an arrangement for piano two-hands and orchestra; however, Ravel did not approve of it and forbade its publication or performance. Cortot ignored this and played his arrangement, which caused Ravel to write to many conductors imploring them not to engage Cortot to play his concerto. After Ravel's death in 1937, Cortot resumed playing his arrangement, and even recorded it with Charles Munch leading the Paris Conservatoire Orchestra. Roger Muraro also played this piece during the 1986 International Tchaikovsky Competition, earning him fourth place in the piano competition.

References

Further reading

External links
 

Compositions by Maurice Ravel
Ravel
1930 compositions
Compositions in D major
Ravel